Thomson Chan Tam-Sun (born 8 May 1941) is a retired football referee from Hong Kong.  He is best known for being a referee at the World Cup in 1982.  He was the referee for one match and served as a linesman for 3 other matches. Now, he sometimes works as a guest commentator in Hong Kong.

References
Profile

1941 births
Living people
FIFA World Cup referees
Hong Kong football referees
1982 FIFA World Cup referees